Sun Won't Shine may refer to:
"Sun Won't Shine", a song by Sentenced from the album Down
"Sun Won't Shine", a song by Skyy from the album Skyyport
"The Sun Won't Shine", a song by Angelfish from their self-titled album
"The Sun Won't Shine", a song by Katrina and the Waves from their self-titled album